Salma Meza Manjarrez (born 14 February 1984) is a Mexican politician from the Institutional Revolutionary Party. In 2012 she served as Deputy of the LXI Legislature of the Mexican Congress representing Jalisco.

References

1984 births
Living people
Politicians from Jalisco
Women members of the Chamber of Deputies (Mexico)
Institutional Revolutionary Party politicians
21st-century Mexican politicians
21st-century Mexican women politicians
Deputies of the LXI Legislature of Mexico
Members of the Chamber of Deputies (Mexico) for Jalisco